Bristow Muldoon (born 19 March 1964 in Glasgow) is a former Scottish Labour politician.

He was the Member of the Scottish Parliament (MSP) for the of Livingston constituency from 1999 to 2007, but then lost the seat to Angela Constance of the SNP. Before this he was a Councillor at both Lothian Regional Council and West Lothian Council.

Prior to 1999, he worked as a manager in a series of roles for InterCity and then for GNER over a period of 13 years.

On 13 August 2007 it was announced that he had been appointed as the first Scottish Parliamentary Liaison Officer jointly for the Royal Society of Edinburgh and the Royal Society of Chemistry.

He is a graduate of both the University of Strathclyde and the Open University.

He is married to Cllr Catherine Muldoon, Deputy Leader of West Lothian Council and has one son

External links 
 

1964 births
Living people
Politicians from Glasgow
Alumni of the University of Strathclyde
Alumni of the Open University
Labour MSPs
Members of the Scottish Parliament 1999–2003
Members of the Scottish Parliament 2003–2007
Scottish Labour councillors